Sarah Sings Soulfully is a 1965 studio album by the American jazz singer Sarah Vaughan, arranged by Gerald Wilson.

Reception

The Allmusic review by Scott Yanow awarded the album four stars and a half said that "Sarah Vaughan's final Roulette session before going back to Mercury was one of her best. Some of the tunes...do not look all that promising but Sassy was near the peak of her powers during this era.".

Track listing
 "A Taste of Honey" (Ric Marlow, Bobby Scott) - 3:14
 "What Kind of Fool Am I?" (Leslie Bricusse, Anthony Newley) - 3:22
 "Guess I'll Hang My Tears Out to Dry" (Sammy Cahn, Jule Styne)  - 4:09
 "Sermonette" (Cannonball Adderley, Jon Hendricks) - 4:19
 "In Love in Vain" (Jerome Kern, Leo Robin) - 4:59
 "Gravy Waltz" (Steve Allen, Ray Brown) - 2:19
 "The Good Life" (Sacha Distel, Jack Reardon) - 3:07
 "Moanin'" (Jon Hendricks, Bobby Timmons) - 3:12
 "'Round Midnight" (Bernie Hanighen, Thelonious Monk, Cootie Williams) - 3:34
 "Easy Street" (Alan Rankin Jones) - 3:30
 "Baby, Won't You Please Come Home" (Charles Warfield, Clarence Williams) - 3:09
 "Midnight Sun" (Sonny Burke, Lionel Hampton, Johnny Mercer) - 5:34

Personnel 
 Sarah Vaughan - vocals
 Teddy Edwards - tenor saxophone
 Ernie Freeman - electronic organ, double bass, guitar
 Carmell Jones - trumpet
 Milt Turner - drums
 Gerald Wilson - arranger

References

1963 albums
Sarah Vaughan albums
Roulette Records albums
Albums arranged by Gerald Wilson
Albums produced by Teddy Reig